The 2001 National Hurling League, known for sponsorship reasons as the Allianz National Hurling League, was the 70th edition of the National Hurling League (NHL), an annual hurling competition for the GAA county teams.  Tipperary  won the league, beating Clare in the final.

Structure
There are 14 teams in Division 1, divided into 1A and 1B. Each team plays all the others once, either home or away. Teams earn one point for a draw and two for a win. The top two teams in 1A and 1B play each other in the NHL semi-finals and final. The bottom teams in each group play each other in a relegation playoff.

There are 10 teams in Division 2. The top two play each other in the final, with the winner promoted. The bottom team is relegated.

There are 9 teams in Division 3. The top two play each other in the final, with the winner promoted.

Division 1

Division 1A

Division 1B

Knock-out stage

Semi-finals

Final

Statistics

Top scorer overall

Single game

Division 2

Division 2 table

Knock-out stage

Division 3

Division 3 table

Knock-out stage

References

League
National Hurling League seasons